The following is a list of Oricon number-one singles of 2000.

Oricon Weekly Singles Chart

References 

2000 in Japanese music
Japan Oricon
Oricon 2000